The Minden Wild Water Preserve is a current natural canoeing and kayaking slalom facility in Minden, Ontario, Canada, and was used for the 2015 Pan American Games canoe slalom events. The facility's renovations were completed in 2014, one year before the 2015 Pan American Games began. The venue was the furthest games venue from Toronto at about 191 km away. 

The renovations to the facility cost about $2 million.

Events hosted
Andrew Westlake Memorial 
1991 Canoe Slalom World Cup
1993 Canoe Slalom World Cup
1997 Canoe Slalom World Cup
2015 Pan American Games

See also
Venues of the 2015 Pan American and Parapan American Games

References

External links
Official Website

Venues of the 2015 Pan American Games
Canoeing in Canada
Water trails